Sithayankottai is a panchayat town in Dindigul district in the Indian state of Tamil Nadu.

Demographics
 India census, Sithayankottai had a population of 12,052. Males constitute 50% of the population and females 50%. Sithayankottai has an average literacy rate of 60%, higher than the national average of 59.5%: male literacy is 69%, and female literacy is 51%. In Sithayankottai, 11% of the population is under 6 years of age.

References

Cities and towns in Dindigul district